FTB may refer to:

Banks 
 Finance Trust Bank, in Uganda

Entertainment 
 Flower Travellin' Band, a Japanese rock band
 From the Bench Digital Entertainment, a Spanish video game developer
 Fukui Television Broadcasting, a Japanese TV station

Other uses 
 California Franchise Tax Board, collects income tax
 Canon FTb, a camera
 Fédération des travailleurs de Burundi, a trade union
 First time buyer of residential property 
 FT Braunschweig, a German football club
 FTB, a Brazilian research rocket made by Fogtrein